Aram Roston is an American investigative journalist,  and author of The Man Who Pushed America to War: The Extraordinary Life, Adventures, and Obsessions of Ahmad Chalabi He is a correspondent for Reuters.

Roston has written for Newsweek, The New York Times, GQ, Mother Jones, The Nation, "Playboy Magazine,"The Guardian, The Observer, New Statesman and other publications.

In 2020 Roston’s reporting on U.S. evangelical leader Jerry Falwell Jr., a key supporter of Donald Trump, preceded Falwell’s resignation from Liberty University. In 2020, Roston published an exclusive interview with Giancarlo Granda, a former business partner of  evangelical leader and university president Jerry Falwell Jr,  Granda  alleged a multiyear sexual relationship with Falwell and his wife, even as the couple led the nation’s largest Christian university, Liberty University.  Falwell stepped down the day after the report.

In 2019, Roston reported that Donald Trump’s fixer Michael Cohen had helped Falwell fix a problem related to “racy photos” in 2015 months before encouraging Falwell to endorse Donald Trump from President.  Falwell's 2016 endorsement of Trump during the Iowa caucus helped Trump lock up Evangelical support.

In 2010, Roston was awarded the Daniel Pearl Award by the International Consortium of Investigative Journalists, for a story called "How the US Funds the Taliban." The expose, which ran in November 2009 in The Nation Magazine, sparked a congressional investigation, and disclosed how a web of Pentagon contractors in Afghanistan routinely pay millions of dollars in protection money to the Taliban. The Daniel Pearl Award is named after the Wall Street Journal correspondent murdered in 2002 in Pakistan and recognizes outstanding international investigative journalism.

In 2016 Roston and his colleague Jeremy Singer-Vine were awarded the Scripps Howard investigative journalism Farfel Award for a BuzzFeed News story called "Fostering Profits," exposing abuses and deaths at the largest for-profit foster care company in the United States, The Mentor Network. The series sparked a U.S. Senate investigation.

Other journalism awards include a 2011 Investigative Reporters and Editors prize, two Emmy awards for investigative business reporting, and a merit award from the Society of Silurians.

He has been a correspondent for BuzzFeed News from 2014 to 2018, was a correspondent for CNN from 1998 through 2001, a producer for the investigative unit at NBC Nightly News from 2003 through 2008, Newsweek in 2011 and 2012, and a police reporter for NY1 News in New York City, and has reported from around the world, including assignments in Iraq, Colombia, Liberia and Afghanistan.

Works

 The Man Who Pushed America to War: The Extraordinary Life, Adventures, and Obsessions of Ahmad Chalabi, Nation Books (2008) , (2009) 
 Meet the 'Prince of Marbella' - is he really supporting Iraq's insurgency?, Aram Roston, The Guardian, October 1, 2006
 Crossing Jordan: Iraq fuel deal sparks lawsuit, Aram Roston, investigative producer NBC News, June 18, 2008
 Former Iraq security contractors say firm bought black market weapons, T. Christian Miller, ProPublica, and Aram Roston, September 18, 2009
 How the US army protects its trucks – by paying the Taliban, Aram Roston, The Guardian, November 13, 2009

References

External links
 Aram Roston archive from "BuzzFeed"
 Aram Roston archive from AlterNet
 Aram Roston archive from The Huffington Post
 Aram Roston archive from Mother Jones
 Aram Roston archive from The Nation
 Aram Roston archive from Democracy Now!
 The Man Who Pushed America to War; The Extraordinary Life, Adventures, And Obsessions of Ahmad Chalabi official book website
 Writer Aram Roston, Parsing Ahmad Chalabi's Past Fresh Air from WHYY at NPR, March 17, 2008, interview and book excerpt
 Aram Roston interview on The Daily Show with Jon Stewart, April 10, 2008
 The Man Who Conned the Pentagon, Playboy (magazine), December 2009 (about Dennis L. Montgomery)
 'The Man Who Conned The Pentagon', Guy Raz, All Things Considered'' from WBUR at NPR, December 19, 2009, audio interview with transcript
 

Living people
American foreign policy writers
American male non-fiction writers
American male journalists
Columbia College (New York) alumni
American political writers
American investigative journalists
Year of birth missing (living people)
BuzzFeed people